Salvemini is a surname. Notable people with the surname include:

Carlo Salvemini (born 1966), Italian politician, mayor of Lecce 
Gaetano Salvemini (1873–1957),  Italian politician, historian and writer
Dan Salvemini (born 1957), former U.S. soccer player
Francesco Salvemini (born 1996), Italian football player
Frederick Salvemini de Castillon (1747–1814), Music theorist
Giovanni Francesco Mauro Melchiore Salvemini di Castiglione (1708–1791), Italian mathematician
Len Salvemini (born 1953),  retired American soccer player
Michele Salvemini (born 1973), Italian rapper, better known as Caparezza
Stefania Salvemini (born 1966), Italian basketball player
Victor Salvemini (1946–2020), Australian Paralympic athlete 

Surnames of Italian origin